Jana Xin Henseler Gallego (born 29 September 2003) is a professional footballer who plays as a goalkeeper for Primera División club Deportivo Alavés. Born in China, she represents Spain internationally.

Early life
Jana Xin was adopted by a German father and a Spanish Asturian mother. Her sister is also adopted from China.

Club career
Jana Xin started her career at Atlético Madrid. On 18 July 2021, she transferred to newly promoted Alavés, signing a two-year contract, having impressed the Basque club with her performance against them while playing for Atlético's B-team in the second division.

Personal life
Jana Xin is of Chinese origin and has Spanish nationality.

References

External links
Profile at La Liga

2003 births
Living people
Chinese adoptees
Chinese emigrants to Spain
Naturalised citizens of Spain
Adoptees
Spanish women's footballers
Women's association football goalkeepers
Atlético Madrid Femenino players
Deportivo Alavés Gloriosas players
Primera División (women) players
Segunda Federación (women) players
Spanish people of Chinese descent
Spain women's youth international footballers